An ecclesiastical dignitary is a member of a cathedral chapter,  or collegiate church.  These offices can include the provost, the dean, the custos and the scholasticus.

References

Catholic ecclesiastical titles